The 2013 Volta ao Algarve was the 39th edition of the Volta ao Algarve cycling stage race. It was rated as a 2.1 event on the UCI Europe Tour, and was held from 14 to 17 February 2013, in Portugal.

The race was won by Germany's Tony Martin, of  courtesy of his dominant victory in the final ITT stage winning the time trial by over a minute. Martin's winning margin over his teammate and runner-up Michal Kwiatkowski was 58 seconds, and Dutch rider Lieuwe Westra completed the podium, a further second behind Kwiatkowski and 59 seconds down on Martin. In the race's other classifications, Italian Giacomo Nizzolo won the points classification, Portugal's Hugo Sabido won the sprints classification, Italy's Manuele Boaro of  won the green jersey for the mountains classification, and  finished at the head of the teams classification.

Race overview

Stages

Stage 1
14 February 2013 – Faro to Albufeira,

Stage 2
15 February 2013 – Lagoa to Lagoa,

Stage 3
16 February 2013 – Portimão to Alto do Malhão,

Stage 4
17 February 2013 – Castro Marim to Tavira, ;  individual time trial (ITT)

Classification leadership

References

External links

Volta ao Algarve
2013
Volta ao Algrave